The 65th Street Yard, also Bay Ridge Rail Yard, is a rail yard on the Upper New York Bay in Sunset Park and Bay Ridge, Brooklyn. Equipped with two transfer bridges which allow rail cars to be loaded and unloaded onto car floats, the last of once extensive car float operations in the Port of New York and New Jersey. Located adjacent to the Brooklyn Army Terminal, it provided a major link in the city's rail freight network in the first half of the twentieth century. It was later used as a conventional railroad yard at the end of the LIRR/NY&A Bay Ridge Branch. The new transfer bridges were constructed in 1999, but remained unused until the transfer bridges were activated in July 2012.

History
The yard was originally operated by the New Haven Railroad. It originally had four electrically operated car float bridges of the Overhead Suspension Contained Apron type (French Patent) and were named in alphabetical order from south to north: "Abie", "Benny", "Charlie" and "Davy". These four transfer bridges handled more than 1000 cars per day from the 1920s to the 1950s. Traffic subsequently declined and the yard was abandoned in 1968, after the New Haven was absorbed in the creation of Penn Central (PC) and float operations were ended by PC. The four transfer bridges were removed in the 1970's.

Around 1978, the New York Dock Railway installed a pontoon supported pony plate girder float bridge, moved from Erie Railroad's West 28th Street Yard in Manhattan. The bridge referred as Brooklyn Army Terminal float bridge, abbreviated BAT, was used until about 1990. Its main purpose was to keep the 65th Street Yard accessible while the First Avenue was reconstructed and the yard could therefore not be reached from the Bush Terminal. The wreck of the bridge is still in the water just off the northwest corner of the yard.

In 1981 the 65th Street Yard was purchased by the City and State of New York, which paid $2.5 million for the  site, and the transfer bridges were rebuilt in 1999 at a cost of $20 million. The new transfer bridges appear to be a simplified design: single two track span with no apron, overhead gantry, counterbalanced with electrically operated span hoist. The design appears to be a variant of the type seen on the West Coast and possibly an improvement on the design of the transfer bridge located at the 207th Street Yard in Manhattan. However these two new transfer bridges had remained unused for car float operations since the New York Cross Harbor Railroad, the successor of New York Dock Railway, abandoned plans to move its operation from Bush Terminal at 50th Street to the 65th Street Yard due to financial disputes between the city and the Railroad.

The New York Cross Harbor Railroad moved rail cars by car float to and from Greenville Yard in Jersey City. It was purchased in 2006 by Mid Atlantic New England Rail, LLC, which renamed the railroad to New York New Jersey Rail, LLC (NYNJ). In 2008 the railroad was bought by the Port Authority of New York and New Jersey The Port Authority also started the restoration of the 65th Street Yard for use by NYNJ in 2011 as part of a $118.1 million investment for the restoration of the existing rail car float system operating between Greenville and sites at 51st and 65th Streets in Brooklyn, N.Y., including the purchase of Greenville Yard.

In July 2012 the 65th Street Yard was reopened, with one transfer bridge in use with the other kept in a stand by mode. Car float operation moved from Bush Terminal to the 65th Street Yard. The goal of NYNJ is to increase the traffic from the actual 1,600 cars to 23,000 cars by 2017. In the future commodities shall include fruit, home heating oil and new cars.

See also
Rail freight transportation in New York City and Long Island
South Brooklyn Railway
Cross-Harbor Rail Tunnel
Bay Ridge Branch
South Brooklyn Marine Terminal

External links
Development of the Carfloat Transfer Bridge in New York Harbor
Industrial, Offline Terminal and Rail-Marine Operations of Brooklyn, Queens, Staten Island, Bronx & Manhattan

References

Rail freight transportation in New York City
Port Authority of New York and New Jersey
Railroads on Long Island
Rail yards in New York (state)
Sunset Park, Brooklyn